The Land is a 1974 South Korean film directed by Kim Soo-yong. It was chosen as Best Film at the Grand Bell Awards.

Plot
Based on a novel, the film chronicles the lives of a wealthy land-owning family during the rule of Gojong.

Cast
Kim Ji-mee
Lee Soon-jae 
Heo Jang-kang
Kim Hee-ra
Hwang Hae
Choi Nam-Hyun
Choe Jeong-min
Woo Yeon-jeong
Yeo Su-jin
Do Kum-bong

Bibliography

Notes

External links

1974 films
1970s Korean-language films
South Korean historical drama films
Best Picture Grand Bell Award winners
Films directed by Kim Soo-yong